Fatima Church is a Catholic religious building located on CIT Road, Kolkata, India. Looked after by the Redemptorist fathers since 1966 the Fatima church serves the Catholic community living in and around CIT Road, Entally, Park Circus and nearby surrounding areas. It was erected into a parish in 1969.

History

On 4 August 1951, the Archbishop of Calcutta Ferdinand Perier gave permission to Jesuit Father Julian Henry (of St Teresa's parish) to acquire a piece of land for the construction of a place of worship in the area. Devotion to our Lady of Fatima was started by Fr Henry S.J. and the chapel was known as 'Fatima shrine'. Regular processions to Fatima Shrine were organized from St. Teresa’s church.

On 7 November 1965, two Redemptorist Fathers, G. Morgan and Daniel O’Callaghan came to Calcutta and formed the first Redemptorist Community. They took over the shrine and centre on 1 January 1966. It was canonically erected a parish on 5 January 1969. On 5 January 1966, Fatima Church was erected as a parish and officially handed over to the redemptorist community.

Personnality 
40 year old Judith D'Souza who was recently kidnapped in Afghanistan belongs to this parish.

Priests to Serve

Parish Priest to Serve Fatima Parish:

 Fr Daniel O’ Callaghan
 Fr Eric Rodrigues
 Fr G Morgan
 Fr Patrick Romeo D’Souza
 Fr Devasia Mangalam
 Fr George Enaickal
 Fr Ivo Fernandes
 Fr John Babu Haldar
 Fr Francis Satish Makhal
 Fr Devasia Mangalam
 Fr John Babu Haldar
 Fr Francis Mukul Mondal (Current)

Areas served
 Entally
 Philips
 CIT Road
 Park Circus
 Darga Road

References

External links
 Fatima Parish Pin Code

Roman Catholic churches in Kolkata
Redemptorist churches